The Bahnar or Ba-Na (. Branch groups of the Bahnar: Jơlơng, Rơngao, Gơlar, Konkơdeh, Tơlô, Kriem, Bơnâm) are an ethnic group of Vietnam and the indigenous people of the Central Highland provinces of Gia Lai and Kon Tum, as well as the coastal provinces of Bình Định and Phú Yên. They speak the Bahnar language belongs the Bahnaric language that belongs to the Mon-Khmer (Austroasiatic) languages family.

Etymology
The word bahnar is similar to the phnom (ភ្នំ) in Mon-Khmer language what means mountain. Besides, they have many names as Bonom, Jolong, Rongao, Tolo, Kriem, Roh, Konkodeh, Golar...

Local groups
Bahnar local groups:
Bahnar Jơlơng...
Bahnar Rơngao...
Bahnar Gơlar(Roh)...
Bahnar KonKde...
Bahnar Kriem...
Bahnar Tơlô...
Bahnar Bơnâm...
...

Culture

Arts
Epics (Bahnar language: H'amon) such as Dam Noi represent centuries-old aspirations of Banar people.

Like many of the other ethnic groups of Vietnam's Central Highlands, the Bahnar play a great number of traditional musical instruments, including ensembles of pitched gongs and string instruments made from bamboo. These instruments are sometimes played in concert for special occasions, which may also involve ceremonial Rượu cần (rice wine) drinking and group dancing.

Festivals
Koh Kpo (or Groong Kpo Tonơi): a festival to express gratitude toward Yang (the god) with the main activity being the stabbing of a water buffalo. A possible Chamic reconstruction of this name would be 'Gleng Ka Ppo Tanguei' 'Dedication to the God of the Corn.' Contemporary Bahnar refer to this ceremony as the even more truncated 'Gong Kpo.'

Notable persons
Dinh Nup, a hero who led villagers to carry out a war of resistance against the French colonial regime. He became the main character of a famous novel entitled Đất nước đứng lên ("Country rising up"), written by Nguyên Ngọc
Ya Dok, a heroine, the wife of Nguyễn Nhạc
Siu Black, popular singer

See also
Bahnar language
Bahnaric languages
Champa
Degar
Tây Nguyên
FULRO

References

Bùi Minh Đạo. 2011. The Bahnar people in Viet Nam. Hanoi: World Publishers. 
Đào Huy Quyền. 1998. Nhạc khí dân tộc Jrai và Bahnar [Musical instruments of the Jrai and Bahnar]. Hanoi: Nhà xuất bản trẻ.
Bahnar language page at Ethnologue site

Ethnic groups in Vietnam